"Sanctity of Brothers" is the fourth track on the 2006 Unearth album, III: In the Eyes of Fire.  The music video to this song is part one to three parts of a story.

Info
Here is what Trevor Phipps, the lead singer, had to say about the video:

Personnel
Trevor Phipps : vocals
Buz McGrath : Guitar
Ken Susi : Guitar
John Maggard : Bass
Mike Justian : drums

External links
 Official Website
 Official Myspace
 Metal Blade Records

2006 singles
2006 songs